Allt om Mat ("Everything about food") is a Swedish gastronomical magazine, published by Bonnier Magazines & Brands. The magazine was launched in 1970. It is the first food magazine in the Swedish magazine market. The magazine is based in Stockholm. The number of issues per year ranges from 5 to 20.

The number of Allt om Mat readers was 441,000 in the first quarter of 2014.

References

External links

1970 establishments in Sweden
Bonnier Group
Food and drink magazines
Irregularly published magazines
Magazines established in 1970
Magazines published in Stockholm
Swedish-language magazines